Molecular and Cellular Neuroscience is a bimonthly peer-reviewed scientific journal covering all aspects of neurosciences. The editors-in-chief are Mathias Bähr (University of Göttingen), Alain Chédotal (Sorbonne University), Henrik Zetterberg (University of Gothenburg), and Noam E. Ziv (Technion). According to the Journal Citation Reports, the journal has a 2021 impact factor of 4.626.

References

External links

Neuroscience journals
Elsevier academic journals
Bimonthly journals
English-language journals
Publications established in 1990